Sielce is a part of the Mokotów district of Warsaw.

Sielce may also refer to:
Sielce, Lublin Voivodeship (east Poland)
Sielce, Gmina Promna in Masovian Voivodeship (east-central Poland)
Sielce, Gmina Stromiec in Masovian Voivodeship (east-central Poland)
Sielce, Gostynin County in Masovian Voivodeship (east-central Poland)